Pavlovaceae is a family of haptophytes. It is the only family in the order Pavlovales, which is the only order in the class Pavlovophyceae. It contains four genera, Diacronema, Exanthemachrysis, Pavlova and Rebecca.

References

Haptophyte families
Eukaryote families